SuperCoach Finals is an online NRL fantasy football game for the NRL football season finals.

SuperCoach Finals asks players to take the role of coach and selector by choosing the ultimate team from Australia's best football players in the NRL Finals Series. Working within a salary cap of $1.4 million, participants select a squad of 7 players each week.

The real-life performance of the players selected determines the participant’s tally of points.  Participants choose a new squad each week according to which NRL teams remain in the finals race. SuperCoach Finals players may also elect to play against other people by creating and joining a private league or by being placed in a public league.

SuperCoach Finals is run by thetelegraph.com.au, The Daily Telegraph and The Sunday Telegraph newspapers in New South Wales, Australia. SuperCoach Finals is also available in Queensland at the Courier Mail, Gold Coast Bulletin and Townsville Bulletin.

SuperCoach Finals is an extension of one of Australia’s biggest NRL fantasy football competitions, NRL SuperCoach.

Strategy 

See strategy section in NRL SuperCoach.

Selecting the SuperCoach Finals squad 

In SuperCoach Finals, participants are required to select a complete squad of 7 players from any NRL club participating in the Finals Series. Squad selection must take into consideration a $1.4 million salary cap and the requirement to fulfil each of the following playing positions:

Only teams with a full squad of 7 players will earn points. When choosing a team for the upcoming week of finals, a team captain must also be nominated. The performance of the team captain will add double points towards the team score.

Points Scoring 

Only the best 6 selected players will earn points. If any of them are unable to play, the 7th selected player will add points towards the fantasy team's total.

By using various statistics that cover all aspects and contributions of NRL players in various playing positions, SuperCoach Finals scoring system presents an accurate way to determine how effective a player has been.

Points are awarded based on the comprehensive scoring system, as highlighted below.

Public and Private Leagues 

See public and private leagues section in NRL SuperCoach.

External links 
 Official thetelegraph.com.au SuperCoach Finals website
 Official thetelegraph.com.au website
 Official Courier Mail website
 Official Townsville Bulletin website
 Official Gold Coast Bulletin website

Fantasy sports
National Rugby League